Josh Starling (born 18 May 1990) is an Australian former professional rugby league footballer. He played for the South Sydney Rabbitohs, Manly Warringah Sea Eagles and Newcastle Knights in the National Rugby League and his position was prop.

Background
Born in Woonona, New South Wales, Starling  played his junior rugby league for the Helensburgh Tigers, before being signed by the South Sydney Rabbitohs.  In 2009 and 2010, Starling played for the South Sydney Rabbitohs' NYC team, before heading up north in 2011 to play for the Tweed Heads Seagulls in the Queensland Cup. During the 2011 season, he signed a contract with the Brisbane Broncos starting in 2012, but later chose to return to the Rabbitohs instead.

Playing career

2012
In round 8 of the 2012 NRL season, Starling made his NRL debut for South Sydney against the North Queensland Cowboys.

2013
On 7 July, Starling signed a three-year contract with the Manly-Warringah Sea Eagles starting in 2014. Later on that month, Starling, whilst playing for the North Sydney Bears in the second-tier New South Wales Cup competition, was selected in the annual New South Wales Residents clash against the Queensland Residents, playing in the curtain-raiser to the State of Origin decider. In September, he was named at prop in the 2013 New South Wales Cup Team of the Year. Finishing up with South Sydney at the end of 2013, he made a total of 40 appearances and scored 3 tries for their New South Wales Cup side North Sydney.

2014
Starling made his Manly-Warringah debut in round 1 of the 2014 season.

2015
Starling played for the Manly club in the 2015 NRL Auckland Nines.

2016
In November, after failing to gain a new contract from Manly-Warringah, Starling signed a one-year contract with the Newcastle Knights starting in 2017.

2017
Starling played 13 matches for the Knights in 2017, before a back injury ended his season. He left the club at the end of the season after not being offered a new contract beyond 2017, before announcing his retirement from the professional level of the game.

References

External links

Newcastle Knights profile
NRL profile

1990 births
Living people
Australian rugby league players
Manly Warringah Sea Eagles players
Newcastle Knights players
North Sydney Bears NSW Cup players
Rugby league players from Wollongong
Rugby league props
South Sydney Rabbitohs players
Tweed Heads Seagulls players